Carolina Santos, born Carolina Ribeiro de Almeida in 1986 in Alhos Vedros, is a Portuguese legal adviser, model and television actress. Since June 2016, she became the Portuguese "Trivago Guy".

References 

1986 births
Living people
People from Moita
Portuguese female models
Portuguese television actresses
21st-century Portuguese actresses